Harakat Al Shabab Sporting Club  is a football club based in Tripoli, Lebanon, that competes in the .

In 1991–92 Harakat Shabab reached the final of the Lebanese FA Cup, losing 2–0 after extra time against Nejmeh.

Honours 
 Lebanese Second Division
 Winners (1): 1993–94
 Lebanese FA Cup
Runners-up (1): 1991–92

References 

Football clubs in Lebanon
Association football clubs established in 1972
1972 establishments in Lebanon